Sorabji Mehta (1904 – 2 May 1988) was an Indian cricketer. He played 22 first-class matches for Hyderabad between 1937 and 1953. He also played first-class cricket for the Parsees in the 1930s and 1940s, and served as the chairman of the Hyderabad Cricket Association. His son Naushir Mehta also played first-class cricket.

See also
 List of Hyderabad cricketers

References

External links
 

1904 births
1988 deaths
Parsi people
Indian cricketers
Hyderabad cricketers
Place of birth missing